Egide Nzojibwami is a geologist and academic who was the first Burundian national to become a member of the Church of Jesus Christ of Latter-day Saints (LDS Church).

Nzojibwami was educated at the University of Liège in Liège, Belgium, and he and his wife were baptised into the LDS Church there on 14 April 1985. He returned to Burundi and eventually became dean of the Faculty of Engineering at the University of Burundi. Nzojibwami holds a PhD in geology from the University of Liège, Belgium and a MSc in civil engineering from the University of Calgary, Canada.

On 27 November 1992, Nzojibwami was set apart as the first branch president of the LDS Church in Burundi. In November 1993, at the beginning of the Burundi Civil War, Nzojibwami left Burundi and emigrated to Canada.

Settling in Calgary, Alberta, Nzojibwami established Technosol Engineering Ltd., a consulting corporation in groundwater and environmental assessment that works in the oil and gas industry and for municipal developments.

References
"Branch flourishing in Burundi", Church News, 1993-08-21
Donald Q. Cannon, Richard O. Cowan, Arnold K. Garr (eds.) (2000). Encyclopedia of Latter-day Saint History (Salt Lake City, Utah: Deseret Book) s.v. "Burundi"
Deseret News 2001–2002 Church Almanac (Salt Lake City, Utah: Deseret News, 2000) pp. 291–292

Burundian geologists
Burundian Latter Day Saints
Burundian religious leaders
Converts to Mormonism
Burundian emigrants to Canada
Living people
People from Calgary
University of Liège alumni
Year of birth missing (living people)
Black Mormons
Franco-Albertan people
Academic staff of the University of Burundi